Charlie Linney (8 September 1925 – 22 December 2008) was  a former Australian rules footballer who played with Fitzroy in the Victorian Football League (VFL).

Notes

External links 
		

1925 births
2008 deaths
Australian rules footballers from Victoria (Australia)
Fitzroy Football Club players